Sika may refer to:

 Sika (people), an ethnic group in Indonesia
 Sika, Burkina Faso, a village
 Sika, Iran, a village
 Sika language, the language of the Sika people
 Sika deer, a species of deer native to East Asia
 Sika AG, a chemical company based in Switzerland
Sika Club Beirut, a former association football club in Lebanon

People with the given name
 Sika Anoaʻi (born 1945), American Samoan professional wrestler
 Sika Koné (born 2002), Malian women's basketball player
 Sika Manu (born 1987), New Zealand rugby league player

People with the surname
 Jutta Sika (1877–1964), Austrian graphic designer and artist
 Paul Sika (born 1985), Ivorian fashion and advertising photographer, creative director and artist
 Salesi Sika (born 1980), Tongan-American rugby union player
 Seïdou Mama Sika (born 1949), Beninese politician
 Semisi Sika, Tongan politician